Results of the 15th Lok Sabha election in Tamil Nadu by state assembly constituents. Overall, in the Indian general election in Tamil Nadu, 2009, United Progressive Alliance (Dravida Munnetra Kazhagam (DMK) and allies) got 27 seats, while United National Progressive Alliance (All India Anna Dravida Munnetra Kazhagam (AIADMK) and allies) got 12 seats.

Thiruvallur

Chennai North

Chennai South

Chennai Central

Sriperumbudur

Kancheepuram

Arakkonam

Vellore

Krishnagiri

Dharmapuri

Thiruvannamalai

Arani

Villupuram

Kallakurichi

Salem

Namakkal

Erode

References 

Tamil Nadu
Indian general elections in Tamil Nadu
2000s in Tamil Nadu
Results of general elections in India